Hosting Controller or Hosting Controller Automation Solution is a commercial automation hosting program created by Advanced Communications of Los Angeles, California USA.  Development of the program began in 1997.

Overview
Hosting Controller Cloud Automation Solution is a business and operational support system for hosting service providers, including shared web hosting for both Linux and Windows. It also supports SaaS and Enterprise hosting services like Microsoft Exchange Server, Virtualization, SharePoint, Active Directory Synchronization and BlackBerry Enterprise Server.

Latest release
HC9, released in March 2012, manages different hosting services in both cluster and simple environments. The current build running is 9.12. It provides support for web hosting companies to manage Windows and Linux servers through a unified interface. The major difference in HC8 is the addition of enterprise modules by which Hosting Service Providers (HSPs) can manage and automate enterprise hosting services such as those listed above.

HC Enterprise Modules
HC Enterprise Modules provide interface with programs such as Microsoft Exchange Server. The modules currently available for live production are:

- Microsoft Exchange 2007
- Microsoft Exchange 2010
- Microsoft Exchange 2013
- BlackBerry Enterprise Server
- SharePoint services
- Microsoft Lync Server
- Microsoft Dynamics CRM

HCnix 
HCnix is a "Linux only" control panel by Hosting Controller and is an independent product.

Add-ons 
Hosting Controller supplements its control panel with a number of Add-ons. The supported Add-ons are:

- RebuildXpress (RBX) 
- One Click Install Applications

Support for other applications 

Hosting Controller supports a number of other applications.  Supported applications include:

- WHMCS
- PayPal
- SpamExperts
- LiteSpeed Web Server
- CloudLinux

Competing software
Plesk
MachPanel
HELM
cPanel
Baifox
DirectAdmin
ispCP
ISPConfig
Kloxo
SysCP
Webmin

References

External links
 

Web server management software